Shahid Yunesi Bakhtun Kola Garrison ( – Pādegān-e Shahīd Yūnesī Bakhtūn Kolā) is a village and military installation in Sharq va Gharb-e Shirgah Rural District, North Savadkuh County, Mazandaran Province, Iran. At the 2006 census, its population was 17, in 6 families.

References 

Populated places in Savadkuh County
Military installations of Iran